Hertelidea is a genus of crustose lichens in the family Stereocaulaceae. Characteristics of the genus include carbon-black ring or outer margin (exciple) around the fruit body disc (apothecium), eight-spored, Micarea-type asci and mostly simple, hyaline ascospores that lack a transparent outer layer. Hertelidea species mostly grow on wood, although less frequently they are found on bark or soil. While the type species, Hertelidea botryosa, has a widespread distribution, most of the other species are found only in Australia.

Taxonomy
Hertelidea was circumscribed in 2004 by Christian Printzen and Gintaras Kantvilas to accommodate species that were formerly referred to as the "Lecidea botryosa" group. Four species were originally included: Hertelidea botryosa, H. eucalypti, H. geophila, and H. pseudobotryosa. H. aspera was transferred to the genus from Lecidea in 2005, while H. wankaensis was described as a new species in 2006.

The genus name honours Hannes Hertel (b.1939), a German Taxonomist and lichenologist and former Director of the Botanische Staatssammlung München, who was the subject of the Festschrift in which this species was published.

Description
Hertelidea lichens have a crustose thallus that is sometimes sorediate. Their apothecia, which are often arranged in conspicuous clusters, are lecideine, meaning that they have a carbonized thin black ring (an exciple) around the cup-shaped apothecium. The paraphyses are weakly to moderately branched and anastomosing, and have pigmented, capitate tips that separate readily in KOH. The asci are eight-spored and Micarea-like, featuring a prominent, amyloid thallus that is more or less lacking an ocular chamber but is pierced by a more darkly staining tubular structure. The ascospores are simple or rarely one-septate, colourless, and non-halonate.

Chemistry
One species, H. eucalypti, contains homosekikaic acid, whereas the others contain perlatolic acid.

Habitat and distribution
Species of Hertelidea are typically found on charred and rotting wood. In Australia, the logs and stumps of eucalypts are a particularly favoured substratum.

Species
Hertelidea aspera (Müll.Arg.) Kantvilas & Elix (2005) – Australia
Hertelidea botryosa (Fr.) Printzen & Kantvilas (2004) – boreal and temperate regions in Northern Hemisphere
Hertelidea eucalypti Kantvilas & Printzen (2004) – Australia
Hertelidea geophila Kantvilas & Printzen (2004) – Australia 
Hertelidea pseudobotryosa R.C.Harris, Ladd & Printzen (2004) – Australia; North America
Hertelidea wankaensis Kantvilas & Elix (2006) – Australia

References

Stereocaulaceae
Lichen genera
Lecanorales genera
Taxa described in 2004
Taxa named by Gintaras Kantvilas